Roy Campbell-Moore is a Scottish artist, dancer and choreographer. He is best known for his contributions to arts in Wales and for co-founding the internationally recognised National Dance Company Wales in 1983 with his spouse, Ann Sholem. In 2013, the couple were presented with a Lifetime Achievement Award at the Theatre Critics of Wales Awards for their contribution to the arts scene in Wales. He now holds the position of Founding Director and Associate Artist at National Dance Company Wales.

He continues to direct new dance, opera and musical productions and works with young people to give them opportunities to train and perform. He is now also a successful dance photographer, showing his work internationally.

Background 

Scottish born in 1951, he was educated in Australia as a radio technician with the Department of Civil Aviation. He began dance training in Brisbane when he was twenty, then studied at the Rambert Ballet School in London before performing with Scottish Ballet from 1975 until 1981. While there he worked with dance-artists such as Rudolph Nureyev, Murray Louis and Peter Darrell who inspired him to become a choreographer. At the age of thirty, he retrained in Cunningham, Limón and Nikolais techniques, and in 1983 he founded Diversions, the Welsh Repertory Dance Company. He was Artistic Director until 2007, when he took on the new post of Artistic Associate, enabling him to concentrate on the Company's wider artistic ambitions. Major achievements include creating over 25 works for the company, touring them nationally and internationally. From 1997, he developed the concept of an international-quality home for the Company at Wales Millennium Centre which opened in 2004.

In 2013, he conceptualised 'The Beauty and The Grit' a programme which allows photographers and dancers engage with dance in its real form. As part of the project, Campbell-Moore has travelled to places in Wales and India (Bangalore and Delhi) to interact with dance companies.

References

External links
Roy Campbell-Moore's home page
In The Flow: a series of photostudies by Roy Campbell-Moore
National Dance Company Wales

1951 births
Living people
Scottish choreographers
Scottish male dancers